Night Crawler is an album by saxophonist Sonny Stitt with organist Don Patterson recorded in 1965 and released on the Prestige label.

Reception

Allmusic awarded the album 2½ stars stating: "This is not so much soul-jazz as solid, unexceptional straight-ahead boppish jazz with organ".

Track listing 
All compositions by Sonny Stitt except as noted
 "All God's Chillun Got Rhythm" (Walter Jurmann, Gus Kahn, Bronisław Kaper) - 3:45  
 "Answering Service" - 4:40 
 "Tangerine" (Victor Schertzinger, Johnny Mercer) - 5:25
 "Night Crawler" - 5:45 
 "Who Can I Turn To?" (Leslie Bricusse, Anthony Newley) - 3:05  
 "Star Eyes" (Gene de Paul, Don Raye) - 5:55

Personnel 
Sonny Stitt - alto saxophone
Don Patterson - organ
Billy James - drums

References 

1966 albums
Prestige Records albums
Sonny Stitt albums
Don Patterson (organist) albums
Albums recorded at Van Gelder Studio
Albums produced by Cal Lampley